Triepeolus is a genus of cuckoo bees in the family Apidae. There are at least 140 described species in Triepeolus. The majority of species whose life history is known are kleptoparasitic in the nests of bees in the tribe Eucerini, especially the genera Melissodes and Svastra.

See also
 List of Triepeolus species

References

 Michener, Charles D. (2007). The Bees of the World, Second Edition, xvi + 953.
 Moure, J. S., and G. A. R. Melo / Moure, Jesus Santiago, Danúncia Urban, and Gabriel A. R. Melo, org (2007). "Nomadini Latreille, 1802". Catalogue of bees (Hymenoptera, Apoidea) in the neotropical region, 578–599.
 Rightmyer, Molly G. (2004). "Phylogeny and classification of the parasitic bee tribe Epeolini (Hymenoptera: Apidae, Nomadinae)". Scientific Papers of the Natural History Museum of the University of Kansas, no. 33, 1-51.
 Rightmyer, Molly G. (2008). "A review of the cleptoparasitic bee genus Triepeolus (Hymenoptera: Apidae). Part I".Zootaxa

Further reading

 NCBI Taxonomy Browser, Triepeolus
 Arnett, Ross H. (2000). American Insects: A Handbook of the Insects of America North of Mexico. CRC Press.

Nomadinae